Rarewerks is a collection of rare and previously unreleased songs by various artists on the Astralwerks electronic music record label.

Track listing
Fatboy Slim - "How Can You Hear Us?" – 5:08
Primal Scream - "Exterminator" (Massive Attack Remix) – 5:09 
Q-Burns Abstract Message – "Feng Shui" Groove Armada's Lost in Space Remix) – 5:47  
Air – "Casanova '70" (The Secret of Cool Brendan Lynch Remix) – 5:31 
Cassius – "Foxxy" (Cassius Remix) – 7:57  
Scanty Sandwich - "This One" – 7:35  
The Chemical Brothers – "Out of Control" (Sasha Instrumental Mix) - 13:22 
Photek - "DNA" – 5:45
Basement Jaxx - "Bingo Bango" (David Morales Latin Dub Mix) – 7:46
The Beta Band - "To You Alone" – 4:50
The Future Sound of London - "Live in New York" – 6:14

2001 compilation albums